Letaba Ranch Provincial Park, is a protected area in Limpopo Province, South Africa. It is located north of Phalaborwa, next to the Kruger Park (border unfenced), and has an area of about 42,000 ha. The Great Letaba River, runs through the park.

Wildlife 
Including: African bush elephant, African buffalo, crocodile, kudu, hippo, African wild dog and giraffe.

Safari Camp 
Letaba Ranch has only one safari camp located in the reserve, Mtomeni Safari Camp. The camp is unfenced and situated on the banks of the Great Letaba River.

See also 
 Balule Nature Reserve
 Klaserie Game Reserve
 Timbavati Game Reserve
 Protected areas of South Africa

References

External links 
 Limpopo Tourism and Parks Board
 Limpopo Parks - Letaba Ranch Provincial Park

Nature conservation in South Africa
Limpopo Provincial Parks